Strahinja Petrović (born 14 June 1992) is a Serbian footballer who plays for Loznica in the Serbian First League.

References

External links
 
 Strahinja Petrović stats at utakmica.rs
 Strahinja Petrović stats at footballdatabase.eu

Living people
1992 births
Sportspeople from Niš
Serbian footballers
FK Radnički Niš players
FK Napredak Kruševac players
FK Radnički Pirot players
FK Sinđelić Niš players
FK Car Konstantin players
FK Loznica players
Association football midfielders
Serbian First League players
Serbian SuperLiga players